Das Volk ("The People") was a daily newspaper published from Berlin, Germany. It was the central organ of the Social Democratic Party of Germany (SPD). The first issue of Das Volk was published on 7 July 1945.<ref name="b2">Felbick, Dieter. Schlagwörter der Nachkriegszeit: 1945 - 1949'. Berlin: de Gruyter, 2003. p. 78</ref> Das Volk was the second working class-newspaper to emerge in Berlin after the Second World War. During its first twenty days of publishing, Das Volk was printed in Berliner format (a relatively small format at the time). Das Volk heeded the calls of the Communist Party of Germany (KPD) for building an anti-fascist democratic Germany, a parliamentary-democratic republic and unity of the working class. The newspaper was controlled by the left-wing tendency inside SPD, and supported merger of the party with KPD.Bulletin, Vol. 17. Das Institut, 1970. p. 14

Otto Meier was the editor-in-chief of the newspaper.Beckert, Rudi. Lieber Genosse Max Aufstieg und Fall des ersten Justizministers der DDR Max Fechner. Berlin: BWV, Berliner Wissenschafts-Verlag, 2003. p. 30 At the time of the founding of the newspaper the deputy editor-in-chief was Engelbert Graf, however the Soviet authorities objected to his presence and he was subsequently removed from this post. Max Nierich and Paul Ufermann were later named as deputy editors. In its initial period Das Volk had a circulation of 50,000-100,000 copies. By September 1945 the circulation reached 150,000, and by January 1946 the circulation stood at 250,000.

The editorial offices were located inside the SPD party headquarters on Behrenstrasse in East Berlin. Meier wanted to shift the editorial offices to West Berlin, but this was allegedly blocked by the Soviet authorities.

On 23 April 1946, Das Volk was replaced by Neues Deutschland (organ of the Socialist Unity Party of Germany, SED), founded as a result of the merger of Das Volk with the KPD organ Deutsche Volkszeitung. During the merger talks between SPD and KPD the idea of retaining publication Das Volk had been discussed, but as a local organ of SED in Berlin. On 25 April 1946, the SED leadership named Max Nierich co-editor-in-chief of Neues Deutschland''.

References

1945 establishments in Germany
1946 disestablishments in Germany
Defunct newspapers published in Germany
German-language newspapers
Newspapers published in Berlin
Daily newspapers published in Germany
Newspapers established in 1945
Publications disestablished in 1946
Social Democratic Party of Germany
Socialist newspapers